Warren Skaaren (March 9, 1946 - December 28, 1990) was an American screenwriter and film producer.

Career
Skaaren was appointed by Governor Preston Smith as executive director of the newly formed Texas Film Commission on December 9, 1970. His first success was getting the film The Getaway shot in Texas. Nearly 40 more feature films were shot in Texas while Skaaren headed the Film Commission. He was a driving force behind the distribution of The Texas Chain Saw Massacre, a film in which he took a personal financial stake. The success of the film enabled Skaaren to leave the Film Commission and begin his career in the film industry.

His notable writing includes: Fire with Fire (1986), Beverly Hills Cop II (1987), Beetlejuice (1988), and Batman (1989). He was also credited as associate producer for Top Gun (1986), having compiled several drafts into the shooting script in less than a week. This resulted in a mention in Variety and led him to acclaim in the industry as a script doctor. He had also written unproduced sequels to The Jewel of the Nile (1985) called The Crimson Eagle and Beetlejuice (1989) called Beetlejuice in Love. According to its draft date, Beetlejuice in Love is believed to be the last screenplay he wrote before his death.

Personal life
Skaaren was a native of Rochester, Minnesota. He graduated from Rice University in Houston, Texas in 1969. He served as the Student Association President from 1968–1969 and was a member of Hanszen College. He moved to Austin, Texas and began working at the Texas Department of Health and Human Services.

He married Helen Griffin on March 7, 1969. He and his wife fostered seven children, and he helped found the Travis County Foster Parents Association. He also served on the board of directors of the Deborah Hay Dance Company. In 1986 he established a private charitable trust, the Laurel Foundation, and was involved with the East West Center, a macrobiotic dietary provider.

He died of bone cancer on December 28, 1990. He was 44 years old.

Legacy
Skaaren's archive resides at the Harry Ransom Center at the University of Texas at Austin.

Filmography
Fire with Fire (with Bill Phillips, Paul Boorstin and Susan Boorstin) (1986)
Beverly Hills Cop II (with Larry Ferguson) (1987)
Beetlejuice (with Michael McDowell) (1988)Batman'' (with Sam Hamm) (1989)

References

External links

1946 births
1990 deaths
American male screenwriters
Deaths from cancer in Texas
People from Rochester, Minnesota
Rice University alumni
Deaths from bone cancer
20th-century American businesspeople
Screenwriters from Minnesota
Film producers from Minnesota
20th-century American male writers
20th-century American screenwriters